Vikram Kumar is an Indian film director and screenwriter.

Vikram Kumar may also refer to:
 Vikram Kumar (physicist), Indian material physicist
 Vikram Kumar (cricketer) (born 1981), English cricketer
 Vikram Sheel Kumar (born 1976), American engineer, doctor, and entrepreneur